Saccharopolyspora kobensis is a bacterium from the genus Saccharopolyspora.

References

 

Pseudonocardineae
Bacteria described in 1989